Billy Goat Hill is an unincorporated community in Cherokee County, Alabama, United States.

References

Unincorporated communities in Cherokee County, Alabama
Unincorporated communities in Alabama